The Eyebrow is a summit in Granite County, Montana, in the United States.

References

Mountains of Granite County, Montana
Mountains of Montana